Donald Christian (28 August 1958 – 15 May 2011) was an Antiguan cyclist. He competed in the 1000m time trial and individual pursuit events at the 1976 Summer Olympics.

References

External links
 

1958 births
2011 deaths
Antigua and Barbuda male cyclists
Olympic cyclists of Antigua and Barbuda
Cyclists at the 1976 Summer Olympics
Place of birth missing